Mahmoud Abbas (born 15 November 1935), also known by the kunya Abu Mazen, is the president of the State of Palestine and the Palestinian National Authority. He has been the chairman of the Palestine Liberation Organization (PLO) since 11 November 2004, PNA president since 15 January 2005, and State of Palestine president since 8 May 2005. Abbas is also a member of the Fatah party and was elected chairman in 2009.

Abbas was elected on 9 January 2005 to serve as President of the Palestinian National Authority until 15 January 2009, but extended his term until the next election in 2010, citing the PLO constitution, and on 16 December 2009 was voted into office indefinitely by the PLO Central Council. As a result, Fatah's main rival, Hamas, initially announced that it would not recognize the extension or view Abbas as the rightful president. Nonetheless, Abbas is internationally recognized in his position(s) and Hamas and Fatah conducted numerous negotiations in the following years, leading to an agreement in April 2014 for a Unity Government (which lasted until October 2016) and to the recognition of his office by Hamas. Abbas was also chosen as the president of the State of Palestine by the PLO Central Council on 23 November 2008, a position he had held unofficially since 8 May 2005.

Abbas served as the first prime minister of the Palestinian Authority from March to September 2003. Before being named Prime Minister, Abbas led the PLO Negotiations Affairs Department.

Early and personal life
Mahmoud Abbas was born on 15 November 1935 in Safed, in the Galilee region of Mandatory Palestine (now Israel). His family fled to Syria during the 1948 Palestine war. Before going to Egypt, Abbas graduated from the University of Damascus, where he studied law.

Abbas later entered graduate studies at the Patrice Lumumba University in Moscow, where he earned a Candidate of Sciences degree (the Soviet equivalent of a PhD). His doctoral dissertation was "The Other Side: The Secret Relationship Between Nazism and Zionism".

He is married to Amina Abbas and they had three sons. The eldest, Mazen Abbas, ran a building company in Doha and died in Qatar of a heart attack in 2002 at the age of 42. The kunya of Abu Mazen means "father of Mazen." Their second son is Yasser Abbas, a Canadian businessman who was named after former PA leader Yasser Arafat. The youngest son is Tareq, a business executive. Abbas has eight grandchildren, six of whom are part of the Seeds of Peace initiative bringing them in touch with young Israelis.

Political activism and career
In the mid-1950s, Abbas became heavily involved in underground Palestinian politics, joining a number of exiled Palestinians in Qatar, where he was Director of Personnel in the emirate's Civil Service. While there in 1961, he was recruited to become a member of Fatah, founded by Yasser Arafat and five other Palestinians in Kuwait in the late 1950s. At the time, Arafat was establishing the groundwork of Fatah by enlisting wealthy Palestinians in Qatar, Kuwait, and other Gulf States.

According to Abu Daoud, part of the funds raised by Abbas were used, without the latter's knowledge, to implement the 1972 Munich massacre. He was among the first members of Fatah to call for talks with moderate Israelis, doing so in 1977. In a 2012 interview, he recalled, "[...] because we took up arms, we were in a position to put them down with credibility."

Abbas has performed diplomatic duties, presenting a moderating contrast to the PLO's "revolutionary" policies. Abbas was the first PLO official to visit Saudi Arabia after the Gulf War in January 1993 to mend fences with the Gulf countries after the PLO's support of Iraq during the Persian Gulf War strained relations. In the Oslo I Accord, Abbas was the signatory for the PLO on 13 September 1993. He published a memoir, Through Secret Channels: The Road to Oslo (1995).

In 1995, he and Israeli negotiator Yossi Beilin wrote the Beilin–Abu Mazen agreement, which was meant to be the framework for a future Israeli–Palestinian peace deal.

It emerged in September 2016 that Abbas may have once worked for the KGB, as early as 1985 in Damascus, according to a document uncovered in the Mitrokhin Archive, where he is registered as agent "Krotov". Palestinian officials replied that at the time in question, the PLO collaborated with Moscow, and that Abbas was their liaison man in the Palestinian-Soviet friendship foundation.

Prime minister

By early 2003, as Israel and the United States refused to negotiate with Yasser Arafat, it was thought that Abbas would be a candidate for the kind of leadership role envisaged by both countries. As one of the few remaining founding members of Fatah, he had some degree of credibility within the Palestinian cause, and his candidacy was bolstered by the fact that other high-profile Palestinians were for various reasons not suitable (the most notable, Marwan Barghouti, was a prisoner in Israeli jail after having been convicted on charges of being responsible for multiple murders by an Israeli court). Abbas's reputation as a pragmatist garnered him favor with the West and some members of the Palestinian legislature. Under international pressure, on 19 March 2003, Arafat appointed Abbas Prime Minister of the Palestinian National Authority. According to Gilbert Achcar, the United States imposed Abbas on Arafat, the democratically elected leader, though the majority of Palestinians thought of the former as a Quisling.

A struggle for power between Arafat and Abbas ensued. Abbas's term as prime minister was characterised by numerous conflicts between him and Arafat over the distribution of power. The United States and Israel accused Arafat of undermining Abbas and his government. Abbas hinted he would resign if not given more control over the administration. In early September 2003, he confronted the Palestinian parliament over this issue.

Abbas came into conflict with Palestinian militant groups, notably the Palestinian Islamic Jihad Movement and Hamas because his pragmatic policies were opposed to their hard-line approach. Initially, he pledged not to use force against the militants in the interest of avoiding a civil war, and attempted negotiation. This was partially successful, resulting in a pledge from the two groups to honor a unilateral Palestinian cease-fire. However, continuing violence and Israeli "targeted killings" of known leaders forced Abbas to pledge a crackdown in order to uphold the Palestinian Authority's side of the Road map for peace. This led to a power struggle with Arafat over control of the Palestinian Security Services; Arafat refused to release control to Abbas, thus preventing him from using them on the militants. Abbas resigned as prime minister in September 2003, citing lack of support from Israel and the United States as well as "internal incitement" against his government.

2005 Presidential election
After Yasser Arafat's death, Abbas was seen, at least by Fatah, as his natural successor. On 25 November 2004, Abbas was endorsed by Fatah's Revolutionary Council as its preferred candidate for the presidential election, scheduled for 9 January 2005. On 14 December, Abbas called for an end to violence in the Second Intifada and a return to peaceful resistance. Abbas told the Asharq Al-Awsat newspaper that "the use of arms has been damaging and should end." However, he refused, or was not able, to disarm Palestinian militants and use force against groups designated (by the Israeli government) as terrorist organisations.

With Israeli forces arresting and restricting the movement of other candidates, Hamas's boycott of the election, and his campaign being given 94% of the Palestinian electoral campaign coverage on TV, Abbas's election was virtually ensured, and on 9 January Abbas was elected with 62% of the vote as President of the Palestinian National Authority.

In his speech, he addressed a crowd of supporters chanting "a million shahids", stating: "I present this victory to the soul of Yasser Arafat and present it to our people, to our martyrs and to 11,000 prisoners". He also called for Palestinian groups to end the use of arms against Israelis.

Presidency and PLO leadership

Despite Abbas's call for a peaceful solution, attacks by militant groups continued after his election, in a direct challenge to his authority. The Palestinian Islamic Jihad Movement in Palestine launched a raid in Gaza on 12 January 2005, that killed one and wounded three Israeli military personnel. On 13 January, Palestinians from the Al-Aqsa Martyrs' Brigades, Hamas, and the Popular Resistance Committees launched a suicide attack on the Karni crossing, killing six Israelis. As a result, Israel shut down the damaged terminal and broke off relations with Abbas and the Palestinian Authority, stating that Abbas must now show a gesture of peace by attempting to stop such attacks. Abbas was formally sworn in as the President of the Palestinian National Authority in a ceremony held on 15 January, in the West Bank town of Ramallah.

On 8 February 2005, Abbas met with Israeli Prime Minister Ariel Sharon at the Sharm el-Sheikh Summit to end the Second Intifada, and they both reaffirmed their commitment to the Roadmap for peace process. Sharon also agreed to release 900 Palestinian prisoners of the 7,500 being held at the time, and to withdraw from West Bank towns.

On 9 August 2005, Abbas announced that legislative elections, originally scheduled for 17 July 2005, would take place in January 2006. On 20 August, he set the elections for 25 January. On 15 January 2006, Abbas declared that, despite unrest in Gaza, he would not change the election date, unless Israel were to prevent Palestinians in East Jerusalem from voting. The elections took place on 25 January 2006, and resulted in a decisive Hamas victory.

On 16 January 2006, in the context of Fatah's election loss and Hamas' presumed future one party government, Abbas said that he would not run for office again at the end of his term. However, following international sanctions against a Hamas one party government, political and military conflicts between Hamas and Fatah, and the division of the country, which made new elections impossible, Abbas stayed president after the expiration of his four-year term on 15 January 2009. He extended his term for another year, using another interpretation of the Basic Law and the Election Law, so he could align the next presidential and parliamentary elections. Pointing to the Palestinian constitution, Hamas disputed the validity of this move, and considered Abbas's term to have ended, in which case Abdel Aziz Duwaik, Speaker of the Palestinian Legislative Council, would have become acting president.

On 16 December 2009, the leadership of the Palestinian Central Council announced an indefinite extension of Abbas's term as president. Since then, Abbas has remained president of the Fatah-controlled areas of the Palestinian territories. In April 2014, Hamas withdrew its objection, in order to form a Unity Government with Fatah.

He announced his resignation as leader of the PLO on 22 August 2015.
As of December 2015, he was still acting as Chairman, pending approval by the Palestinian National Council.

In 2021, local elections in Palestine were held amidst a rift between Abbas and Hamas. This was after he had indefinitely postponed the presidential election and parliamentary elections.

Corruption allegations
There are frequent allegations that officials of the Palestinian Authority, including Abbas, have systematically embezzled public funds.

Abbas's mentor and predecessor, Yasser Arafat, was accused of embezzling billions of dollars of Palestinian money. This perceived corruption of the Fatah leadership is believed to have contributed to a convincing win by Hamas in the January 2006 parliamentary election. Fatah leaders were accused of siphoning funds from ministry budgets, passing out patronage jobs, accepting favors and gifts from suppliers and contractors.

The source for specific allegations against Abbas was one of Arafat's most trusted aides, Mohammed Rashid, accused by the PA of embezzling hundreds of millions of dollars, who threatened to expose corruption scandals in the Palestinian Authority. For many years, Rashid served as Arafat's financial advisor and was given a free hand to handle hundreds of millions of dollars that were poured on the Palestinian Authority and the PLO by US, EU and Arab donors. According to Rashid, Abbas's net worth was $US100 million.

On 10 July 2012, Abbas and his sons were attacked, in the US Congress, for their alleged corruption. The debate was entitled Chronic Kleptocracy: Corruption Within the Palestinian Political Establishment In his testimony before the House Committee on Foreign Affairs, Subcommittee on Middle East and South Asia, Elliott Abrams stated that "Corruption is an insidious destroyer not only of Palestinian public finance but of faith in the entire political system. And it has certainly had an impact on potential donors. I can tell you from my own experience, as an American official seeking financial assistance for the PA from Gulf Arab governments, that I was often told "why should we give them money when their officials will just steal it?""

The conspicuous wealth of Abbas's own sons, Yasser and Tarek, has been noted in Palestinian society since at least 2009, when Reuters first published a series of articles tying the sons to several business deals, including a few that had U.S. taxpayer support. In a Foreign Policy article, author Jonathan Schanzer suggested four ways in which the Abbas family has become rich. They include monopolies on American made cigarettes sold in the territories; USAID funding; public works projects, such as road and school construction, on behalf of the Palestinian Authority and special preferences for retail enterprises. It was strongly implied that the sons lineage was the main credential in receiving these contracts.

One of his sons, Yasser Abbas, (but not brother Tarek or father Mahmoud) filed a $10 million libel lawsuit in the United States District Court, District of Columbia, in September 2012 against Foreign Policy Group LLC and Schanzer alleging "false and defamatory statements. It seems every statement will be challenged, in a jury trial, if the court accepts jurisdiction." Abbas also accused Schanzer of not contacting him for comment and of relying on untrustworthy sources of information. Abbas accused Schanzer of acting with malice and pursuing an agenda against the brothers, even though he also contended that he's a private citizen and not a public figure, so we wouldn't need to prove actual malice to win. In reply, the magazine has argued that Abbas's suit is aimed at intimidating his critics and stopping debate. "In the final analysis, the commentary falls well within the protections of both the First Amendment and the common law," lawyers for the magazine assert.

Some analysts believed the Abbas family would not proceed with the case as it would allow Foreign Policy and Schanzer to dig in too deep into the PA's secret finances and records. However, the case proceeded.

In September, 2013, U.S. District Judge Emmet Sullivan dismissed the suit using D.C.'s anti-SLAPP measure. Sullivan determined the lawsuit intended to censor, intimidate, and silence critics by burdening them with the cost of a legal defense until they abandoned their criticisms or opposition. The decision has been appealed.

As part of the 2016 Panama Papers data leak, it was revealed that Abbas's son Tareq Abbas holds $1 million in shares of an offshore company associated with the Palestinian Authority.

In June 2021, hundreds of Palestinians held protests against the Abbas administration's corruption and brutality at central Ramallah (including one held at the president's headquarters) after anti-corruption activist Nizar Banat died in government custody.

Relations with Israel

On 23 January 2005, Israeli radio reported that Abbas had secured a thirty-day ceasefire from Hamas and Palestinian Islamic Jihad. On 12 February, lone Palestinians attacked Israel settlements and Abbas quickly fired some of his security officers for not stopping the attacks during the ceasefire.

On 9 April 2005, Abbas said that the killing of three Palestinians in southern Gaza by Israeli soldiers was a deliberate violation of the declared ceasefire deal. "This violation is made on purpose," Abbas said in a written statement sent to reporters in the West Bank capital of Ramallah. Abbas made the statement shortly after three Palestinian teenage boys were shot dead by Israeli troops in the southern Gaza town of Rafah. Israel claimed they thought the boys were attempting to smuggle weapons, while Palestinians claimed a group of boys were playing soccer and three of them went to retrieve the ball near the border fence.

On 25 July 2005, he announced that he would move his office to Gaza until the complete withdrawal of Israeli troops in order to coordinate the Palestinian side of the withdrawal, mediating between the different factions.

Efraim Sneh, a former minister in the Israeli cabinet, has called Abbas the most "courageous partner we have had." He wrote that on 19 April 2006, following the elections in Israel but before Ehud Olmert was sworn in, he met with Abbas, and Abbas requested that negotiations resume immediately with the new Israeli government and that he be put in touch right away with a contact person to be appointed by the prime minister. Sneh reported that he immediately conveyed the substance of their meeting to the prime minister's office, but was told that the prime minister had no interest in the matter. Despite this, Sneh mentions that the Annapolis Conference convened a year and a half later, and that in September 2008, Prime Minister Olmert and Abbas came to understandings that would lead to an actual agreement.

On 2 March 2008, Abbas stated he was suspending peace talks with Israel, while Israeli Prime Minister Ehud Olmert vowed to press on with military operations against militants who have been launching home-made rockets into southern Israel.

On 20 May 2008 Abbas said he would resign from his office if the current round of peace talks had not yielded an agreement in principle "within six months".  He also said that the current negotiations were, in effect, deadlocked: "So far, we have not reached an agreement on any issue.  Any report indicating otherwise is simply not true."

Abbas has since confirmed that he turned down an Israeli offer for a Palestinian state on nearly 95% of the West Bank. In September 2008, Olmert had presented him with a map that delineated the borders of the proposed PA state, for which Israel would annex 6.3 percent of the West Bank and compensate the Palestinians with 5.8 percent (taken from pre-1967 Israel), which Abbas stated he rejected out of hand, insisting instead to demarcate the 4 June 1967 borders of Palestine. He said that Olmert did not give a map of the proposal and that he could not sign without seeing the proposal. Abbas also said that he was not an expert on maps and pointed to Olmert's corruption investigation (he was later convicted). Abbas said in October 2011 that he made a counteroffer to let Israel annex 1.9% of the West Bank.

In 2012, Abbas floated the idea of accepting a two-state solution which outlined Palestine as existing within the 1967 borders with a capital in East Jerusalem.  In an interview with Israeli Channel 2 TV, Abbas said, "It is my right to see [the Israeli city of Safed], but not to live there." The negative reaction to these words forced Abbas to backpedal.

According to an International Crisis Group report, most Israeli officials "do not see [Abbas] as a peace partner but consider [him] a nonthreatening, violence-abhorring, strategic asset."

On 23 June 2016, Abbas repeated to the European Parliament a false press report that rabbis in Israel were calling for Palestinian wells to be poisoned. Abbas retracted the statement the following day, acknowledging that the claim was not true and stating that he 'didn't intend to do harm to Judaism or to offend Jewish people around the world'. Israel's Prime Minister Benjamin Netanyahu said Abbas's statement spread a "blood libel".

Relations with Hamas
On 25 May 2006, Abbas gave Hamas a ten-day deadline to accept the 1967 ceasefire lines.

On 2 June 2006, Abbas again announced that if Hamas did not approve the prisoners' document—which calls for a two-state solution to the Israeli-Palestinian conflict according to the 1967 borders—within two days, he would present the initiative as a referendum. This deadline was subsequently extended until 10 June 2006. Hamas spokesmen stated that their stance would not change, and that Abbas is not constitutionally permitted to call a referendum, especially so soon after the January elections.

Abbas warned Hamas on 8 October 2006, that he would call new legislative elections if it did not accept a coalition government. To recognize Israel was a condition he has presented for a coalition. But it was not clear if Abbas had the power to call new elections.

On 16 December 2006, Abbas called for new legislative elections, to bring an end to the parliamentary stalemate between Fatah and Hamas in forming a national coalition government.

On 17 March 2007, a unity government was formed incorporating members of both Hamas and Fatah, with Ismail Haniyeh as Prime Minister and independent politicians taking many key portfolios.

On 14 June 2007, Abbas dissolved the Hamas-led unity government of Haniyeh, declared a state of emergency, and appointed Salam Fayyad in his place. This followed action by Hamas armed forces to take control of Palestinian Authority positions controlled by Fatah militias. The appointment of Fayyad to replace Haniyeh has been challenged as illegal, because under the Palestinian Basic Law, the president may dismiss a sitting prime minister, but may not appoint a replacement without the approval of the Palestinian Legislative Council. According to the law, until a new prime minister is thus appointed, the outgoing prime minister heads a caretaker government. Fayyad's appointment was never placed before, or approved by the Legislative Council. For this reason, Haniyeh, the Hamas prime minister has continued to operate in Gaza, and is recognised by a large number of Palestinians as the legitimate acting prime minister. Anis al-Qasem, a constitutional lawyer who drafted the Basic Law, is among those who publicly declared Abbas's appointment of Fayyad to be illegal.

On 18 June 2007, the European Union promised to resume direct aid to the Palestinian Authority, and Abbas dissolved the National Security Council, a sticking point in the defunct unity government with Hamas. That same day, the United States decided to end its fifteen-month embargo on the Palestinian Authority and resume aid, attempting to strengthen Abbas's West Bank government. A day later, the Fatah Central Committee cut off all ties and dialogue with Hamas, pending the return of Gaza.

Relations with foreign leaders

In May 2009, he welcomed Pope Benedict XVI to the West Bank, who supported Abbas's goal of a Palestinian State. Also in May 2009, Abbas made a visit to Canada, where he met with foreign affairs minister Lawrence Cannon and Prime Minister Stephen Harper. The same year Abbas visited Venezuela and met Hugo Chávez.

In February 2010, Abbas visited Japan for the third time as Palestinian President. In this visit he met Prime Minister Yukio Hatoyama. He also visited Hiroshima, the first such visit by a Palestinian leader, and spoke about the suffering of Hiroshima, which he compared to the suffering of the Palestinians.

In July 2012, Abbas accused former U.S. Secretary of State Condoleezza Rice of fabricating a conversation between them and denied such a conversation took place. The specific quote he denied was, "I can't tell four million Palestinians only five thousand of them can go home," regarding the issue of Palestinian refugees. Abbas further said, "I'm not calling her a liar... I am saying we never had that conversation." In response, Rice denied that she fabricated it. Her chief of staff, Georgia Godfrey, wrote, "Dr. Rice stands by her account of the conversation and what she wrote in her book."

In January 2019, Abbas accepted the chairmanship of the United Nations' Group of 77, a coalition of 134 mainly developing nations and China, on behalf of Palestine, which is a non-member observer state of the UN. He was handed the gavel by Egypt's Foreign Minister Sameh Shoukry, the outgoing chairman. (Guyana holds the chairmanship as of 2020.)

Published works and statements about the Holocaust

The Connection between the Nazis and the Leaders of the Zionist Movement 1933–1945 is the title of Abbas's CandSc thesis, which was completed in 1982 at the Peoples' Friendship University of Russia, and defended at the Institute of Oriental Studies of the Soviet Academy of Sciences. In 1984 it was published as a book in Arabic titled "The Other Side: the Secret Relationship Between Nazism and Zionism" (Arabic: Al-Wajh al-Ākhar: Al-'Alāqat aL-Sirriyya bayn al-Nāzīyya wa al-Sahyūniyya).

The dissertation and book discussed topics such as the Haavara Agreement, in which the Jewish Agency signed a pact with Nazi Germany to facilitate Jewish emigration to Palestine. Some content of his thesis has been considered as Holocaust denial by some Jewish groups, especially where he disputed the accepted number of Jews murdered in the Holocaust and claimed Zionist agitation had been the cause of the Holocaust.

In his 1984 book, based on the dissertation, Abbas dismissed as a "myth" and "fantastic lie" that six million Jews were murdered in the Holocaust, writing that the real figure was at most "890,000" or "a few hundred thousand". The number of such deaths, he claimed, had been exaggerated for political purposes, since:
it seems that the interest of the Zionist movement ... is to inflate this figure so that their gains will be greater. This led them to emphasize this figure [six million] in order to gain the solidarity of international public opinion with Zionism. Many scholars have debated the figure of six million and reached stunning conclusions—fixing the number of Jewish victims at only a few hundred thousand.

According to the Anti-Defamation League, when asked about this assertion in his book, Abbas replied some 10 years later that he had written the book when the Palestinians were at war with Israel, adding that "today I would not have made such remarks." In a March 2006 interview with Haaretz, Abbas stated,
I wrote in detail about the Holocaust and said I did not want to discuss numbers. I quoted an argument between historians in which various numbers of casualties were mentioned. One wrote there were 12 million victims and another wrote there were 800,000. I have no desire to argue with the figures. The Holocaust was a terrible, unforgivable crime against the Jewish nation, a crime against humanity that cannot be accepted by humankind. The Holocaust was a terrible thing and nobody can claim I denied it.

In 2012, Abbas told Al Mayadeen, a Beirut television station affiliated with Iran and Hezbollah, that he "challenges anyone who can deny that the Zionist movement had ties with the Nazis before World War II". In 2013, he reasserted that "the Zionist movement had ties with the Nazis". The following year, he described the Holocaust as "the most heinous crime in modern history."

During a meeting of the Palestinian National Council in 2018, Abbas stated that Jews in Europe were massacred for centuries because of their "social role related to usury and banks." The speech was widely condemned by Israel, the United Nations, the European Union, Germany, Sweden, United States, former officials of the Obama administration, Peace Now and the Anti-Defamation League. A New York Times editorial said "Let Abbas's vile words be his last as Palestinian leader."

In August 2022, during a joint press conference with German Chancellor Olaf Scholz in Berlin, Abbas was asked by an attending journalist if he would apologize for the 1972 Munich massacre of Israeli Olympic athletes by Palestinian terrorists. He responded that "If we want to go over the past, go ahead. I have 50 slaughters that Israel committed… 50 massacres, 50 slaughters, 50 holocausts." In an interview afterwards with the Bild tabloid, Scholz condemned Abbas' statements as a trivialization of the Holocaust. The remarks were also condemned by the Israeli Ministry of Foreign Affairs. Following an offense report for "relativizing the Shoah", in Berlin a criminal investigation was opened by police to determine if Abbas is guilty of Volksverhetzung. The investigation was closed because Abbas enjoys diplomatic immunity.

See also 
 List of international presidential trips made by Mahmoud Abbas

References

Notes

Footnotes

Further reading
 Encyclopedia of World Biography: Supplement #27 (Thomson-Gale, 2007) pp. 1–3.

External links

 

|-

|-

|-

1935 births
Living people
Fatah members
Presidents of Palestine
Members of the Palestinian Legislative Council
Palestinian refugees
Palestinian Sunni Muslims
Peoples' Friendship University of Russia alumni
People from Safed
Prime Ministers of the Palestinian National Authority
Sri Lanka Mitra Vibhushana
Damascus University alumni
Presidents of the Palestinian National Authority
Members of the Executive Committee of the Palestine Liberation Organization
Central Committee of Fatah members
Mahmoud Abbas